Full Throttle (烈火戰車) is a 1995 Hong Kong action drama film directed by Derek Yee and starring Andy Lau.

Plot
Joe (Andy Lau) is a youth who loves auto racing. His father Paul (Paul Chun) operates a motorbike business which often organizes motorbike teams to race in Macau and Japan and his racers would often be awarded the crown bike. However, Joe has been rumored to be the best among the racers because every crown bike is always defeated in hands of Joe on the streets. Since Joe's license has been revoked for speeding at the age of 19, he is unable to participate in an official race and can only secretly race in the streets to fulfill his desire of racing on the roads. Joe's father is very irritated about this and views his son as an outlaw biker so he prohibits his racers to race with Joe which sours their father and son relationship.  Joe owns an auto repair shop with his friend Jimmy (Chin Ka-lok). Joe's girlfriend Annie (Gigi Leung) is very gentle and kind but she always worries about her boyfriend racing.

David (David Wu) is a youth racer returning from England and hits it off with Joe. Seven years later, Joe readmits his license, ready to show his talents in a race in Macau, but is unable to obtain a racing license which leads him to think that his father is playing some dirty tricks. Retired racer Lo Kwai (Elvis Tsui) advises Joe to reconcile with his father to get a better chance to race. But as usual, once the father and son meet, they argue and his father give the place of the final racer to David. Paul's racers have always been dissatisfied with Joe but races with him. In the process, Joe becomes injured in the accident and lands in a coma for 10 days. Under Annie's care, Joe's condition improves but he ultimately misses the race in Macau as he hopelessly watches David become the champion.

After the accident, Joe develops a fear of racing, and is afraid that he can no longer race in the future. Annie is happy about this and persuades him to give up racing and concentrate on operating his repair shop. However, other bikers are waiting for Joe to defeat Macau champion David on the streets but Joe has yet to take action. Rumors spread that Joe is scared and can no longer race. Jimmy is extremely indignant about this and challenges David himself.  Jimmy gets into an accident and dies from his injuries.

Jimmy's death leads Joe to become even more determined to overcome his fear and get his confidence back. Because of Joe's decision to officially challenge David, Anne becomes heartbroken and decides to leave him.  Joe arranges to race with David in the mountains, hoping to find the pleasurable feeling of racing again. Initially, Joe lost pace as he had constant flashbacks from the near-fatal crash he had and he had to stop for awhile. Which stopping, he managed to hype himself up and went on to match and even chase down David who has distance on him. After a few laps, Joe stops to avoid crashing into the cart and empty cans that had rolled onto the road and spilled over being collected by an old lady. The old lady speaks a few words to Joe which woke him up to what he is doing and after the race, questions whether both David and him are stupid to throw their lives like this for vain and unwanted glory and after the talk with David, he decides to give up racing forever and chases after Annie on the advice of David.

Cast and roles
 Andy Lau as Joe
 Paul Chun as Paul
 Chin Kar-lok as Jimmy
 David Wu as David
 Gigi Leung as Annie
 Elvis Tsui as Lo Kwai
 Lau Ying-hung as Kwang
 Law Chi-leung as Chu
 Ha Ping as Jimmy's Grandmother

Theme song
The Affectionate Sentence (情深的一句)
Composer: Eric Chen
Lyricist: Andy Lau
Singer: Andy Lau

Box office
The film grossed a strong HK$33,770,736 at the Hong Kong box office during its theatrical run from 14 December 1995 to 24 January 1996 in Hong Kong.

Awards and nominations

See also
Andy Lau filmography
List of biker films
Honda NSR250R

External links
 
 HK cinemagic entry
 loveHKfilm entry

1995 films
1990s action drama films
1995 romantic drama films
Hong Kong action drama films
Hong Kong romantic drama films
Motorcycling films
Motorcycle racing films
Hong Kong auto racing films
Films directed by Derek Yee
Films set in Hong Kong
Films shot in Hong Kong
1990s Hong Kong films